Corinth House is a 1961 Australian TV movie based on the play by Pamela Hansford Johnson and directed by Bill Bain. It was sold overseas.

It was the ABC's first live drama of 1961.

Plot
Set in a private hotel in London. One of its residents is Miss Malleson, a retired headmistress living out the rest of her days. She is visited by an ex pupil, Madge Donnythrope, who sixteen years earlier Miss Malleson disciplined publicly. Madge is determined to get revenge on the headmistress by convincing others she is insane.

Cast
 Enid Lorimer as Miss Malleson
 Diana Perryman as Madge Donnythorpe
 Gwen Bevan as Mrs. Beauclerc, the manageress
 Ida Newton as Miss Figgis
 Gwen Plumb as Mrs. Heysham
 Hugh Stewart as Major Shales
 Audrey Teesdale as Nora, the maid

Reception
The Australian Woman's Weekly called it "excellent".

The Sydney Morning Herald said "The outstanding and positive thing about this play is its utter suitability to the medium of television" starring "two actresses of exceptional power."

See also
List of television plays broadcast on Australian Broadcasting Corporation (1960s)

References

External links

1956 British TV version at IMDb

Australian drama television films
Australian television plays
1961 television films
1961 films
1961 drama films